Valda Berzins is an Australian businesswoman, entrepreneur, and award-winning general manager who has held senior, high-profile executive roles in Australian organisations including Australia Post, Victoria Police, and Foster's Group.

In 2008, she founded the interior and exterior design house, Valdasigns, and currently holds the position of director of the business.

Biography 
Valda Berzins was born in East Melbourne, Victoria on the 26th of January, to Latvian parents who migrated to Australia in their efforts to escape communism. 
Berzins’ parents originally arrived in Port Melbourne by ship during the post-war immigration boom and were transferred to the Bonegilla Migrant Reception and Training Centre in the northeast of Victoria. Prior to his arrival in Australia, Berzins’ father pursued a degree in mechanical engineering. Due to the ongoing war in Latvia, he was forced to abandon the final year of the degree.

Despite the fact that Berzins's father had almost completed his degree and her mother being a fully qualified nursing Sister, they had to work in unskilled jobs to support themselves. During this time, Berzins's father held a day job and attended night school. After a few years, he attained an accounting diploma from the Royal Melbourne Institute of Technology (RMIT).
As a child, Valda grew up in the suburb of Glenroy, along with her parents and sister, Nora. Later on, her family relocated to Pascoe Vale, where the family lived for numerous years. It is also in this same suburb that Berzins purchased her first house at the age of 22, a large seven-bedroom house on a 1,000m² block of land.

Her interest in gardening and home renovation began to form during this period, as Berzins personally redesigned and decorated the house according to her own vision. Berzins spent only a small sum on renovations but managed to sell the house 7 years later at triple the sum of her initial investment.

After that, Berzins relocated to North Balwyn and lived there for many years. She currently resides in Mount Martha, Victoria, with her husband of 23 years, Brian.

Career 

Prior to 1995, Berzins held various accounting positions and strategic planning roles with Carlton & United Breweries (Foster's). She was then promoted to Assistant Company Secretary and Finance Manager. During her time at Foster's, Berzins directed mergers and acquisitions that aided the business. Later on, she became the executive director of Information Systems for Foster's.

From July to November 1995, Berzins worked as Finance Director for the American-based toy manufacturing company, Mattel, Inc.

Berzins' career came to prominence as she took on the role of Group Manager of IT Services with the Australia Post. After a few years, the Australia Post specifically created the role of Chief Information Officer (CIO) for Berzins. She served as CIO for the Australia Post from 1996 to 2004.

Berzins later stepped into the role of CIO with the Victoria Police from 2004 to 2008. During her time with Victoria Police, Berzins managed to implement several tech policies as well as set up IT contracts.

In 2008, Berzins left the Victoria Police after being heavily criticised in a Victorian Ombudsmans's report on the mismanagement of IT contracts for the police.

Education 

Berzins has successfully obtained numerous credentials and tertiary qualifications.

 Bachelor of Commerce - University of Melbourne
 Bachelor of Science - University of Melbourne
 Diploma of Professional Interior Design - The Interior Design Academy (Double Bay, New South Wales)
 Fellow of Australian Computer Society (FACS)
 Certified Practising Accountant (CPA)
 Registered Tax Agent
 Real Estate Agents’ Representatives’ Qualification

Awards 

 Scholarship to the Australian Graduate School of Management (1993)
 Australia's 30 top leaders in IT in Robert Williams’ book “Success in IT” ( 2000)
 Computerworld Fellow (2001)
 IT &T's CIO of the Year (2002) (Equivalent to the Financial Review's CFO of the Year)
 CIO's Executive Council Top 20 Asia Pacific CIOs (2007)
 Committee member of various University IT Boards and CPA Working Groups
 Keynote Speaker at select Australian and overseas seminars

References

Living people
Australian women in business
Year of birth missing (living people)
Businesspeople from Melbourne
University of Melbourne alumni
University of Melbourne women
Chief information officers
People from Pascoe Vale, Victoria
Australian people of Latvian descent